Glenn Winston (born April 29, 1989) is an American football running back who is currently a free agent. He played college football at Michigan State and Northwood. He was signed by the San Francisco 49ers as an undrafted free agent in 2014 and has also played for the Cleveland Browns.

College career
Winston attended Michigan State University for two years, before being dismissed from the team for violation of team rules. Winston had been involved in two on-campus altercations. The first occurred in October 2008, where he assaulted Michigan State hockey player A. J. Sturges, leaving him seriously injured and unable to play hockey for two years. The second occurred in December 2009 along with other teammates in a brawl at Michigan State's Rather Hall. He was later sentenced to six months in jail for the Sturges incident. In 2013, Winston enrolled at Northwood University. In his lone season at Northwood he rushed for 717 yards and nine touchdowns in eight games.

Professional career
Winston was signed by the San Francisco 49ers after going undrafted in the 2014 NFL Draft. He was released by the 49ers and claimed off waivers by the Cleveland Browns on August 31, 2014. He got his first NFL carry on December 13, 2015. On the play, San Francisco 49ers linebacker Ian Williams stripped the ball and reportedly gave Winston a concussion. It would be Winston's only NFL carry.

References

External links
Cleveland Browns bio
Northwood Timberwolves bio
Michigan State Spartans bio
"The 10 Least Consequential Athletes of the Decade" by Jon Bois, for SB Nation

1989 births
Living people
Denby High School alumni
Players of American football from Detroit
American football running backs
Michigan State Spartans football players
Northwood Timberwolves football players
San Francisco 49ers players
Cleveland Browns players